Julia Pascal  is a British playwright and theatre director.

Biography
A Jewish atheist, Pascal's stage plays include three grouped together as The Holocaust Trilogy. The first of these is Theresa, based on historical accounts of a Jewish woman in Guernsey during the German occupation in the Second World War. Original music for the play was composed by Kyla Greenbaum. It is followed by A Dead Woman on Holiday, which is set during the Nuremberg Trials, followed by her adaptation of Solomon Anski's The Dybbuk. Crossing Jerusalem, is about the conflict in the Middle East, The Golem, a version of the Prague myth of the Golem for young audiences, St Joan a satire based on a Jewish Black Londoner who dreams she is Joan of Arc and Year Zero which reveals World War II stories from Vichy France. In 2007, her adaptation of The Merchant of Venice was staged at the Arcola Theatre and printed as The Shylock Play in 2009. Her autobiographical essay "Prima Ballerina Assoluta" appeared in a [Virago Press] collection Truth, Dare or Promise. Her other plays include The Yiddish Queen Lear and Woman In The Moon. Oberon Press publishes the texts of her plays.

Pascal was a NESTA Dreamtime Fellow in 2006 and Writer in Residence at the Wiener Library in 2007 with a Leverhulme Grant. Her archive is held by the University of York where she was Writer in Residence in 2003. Pascal's television drama documentary for the BBC, Charlotte and Jane won awards from BAFTA and the Royal Television Society. Her journalism has been published in The Guardian, The Observer.The Independent, the Financial Times and The Times.

The Dybbuk premiered in London at the New End Theatre, Hampstead in July 1992, then the Lilian Baylis Theatre. Since 1992 it has played in Munich at the Festival of Jewish Theatre, at Maubeuge's International Theatre Festival, in Poland (British Council tour), Sweden, Belgium and a major British regional tour. The Dybbuk had its US premiere at Theater for the New City in New York City in August 2010. The Wedding Party (known as Bloody Wedding) was premiered at The Ohrid Festival 2012, Macedonia and was performed at The Actor's Centre, London in 2013.

Her play Nineveh was produced by Theatre Témoin at Riverside Studios in 2013. St Joan was produced at the Edinburgh Festiva in August 2014 at The Bedlam Theatre.

Pascal's play Crossing Jerusalem became the centre of controversy in early 2016 when the Michael-Ann Russell Jewish Community Center’s Cultural Arts Theatre in North Miami-Dade cut short the play's schedule, bending to members of the Jewish community who found the play to be critical of Israel. The Miami Herald said the incident "has left raw feelings among those who call the cancellation a capitulation to politics and those who say the play was deeply and needlessly hurtful". Pascal protested that “the intent of the play was to show the complexity of Israeli life”, and called the early closure "censorship." Forward magazine commented: "The controversy mirrors others faced by American JCCs over media perceived to be critical of Israel, notably in Washington and New York".
Crossing Jerusalem was produced at the Karlsruhe Staatstheater as Mittendurch Jerusalem translated by Thomas Huber.

In 2016, Pascal received her PhD from York University's Theatre, Film and Television Department. King's College London awarded her a Research Fellowship in 2017. 
She is an Associate Research Fellow in the School of Arts at Birkbeck University of London and a Visiting Lecturer at City University on the MA Theatre Writing course.
She teaches Theatre at St Lawrence University's London Study Abroad Program.
In 2019-2020 she is Writer in Residence at Dyspla.

In 2019 her play inspired by Kurdish women soldiers, Blueprint Medea, premiered at The Finborough Theatre, London.

References

External links
https://www.theguardian.com/commentisfree/2018/apr/24/women-theatre-quotas-stage-gender
Pascal Theatre Company
Julia Pascal article, guardian.co.uk
Rehearsed reading of Broken English on 5 October 2009 at The Drill Hall
Rehearsed reading of Woman on the Bridge on 9 November 2009 at The Drill Hall
Information on her at London Metropolitan University
Julia Pascal Archives at University of York
Julia Pascal, "I slept with my teacher", The Times, 9 October 2008. 
List of articles published by her in New Statesman

Living people
Jewish women writers
Jewish atheists
British atheists
British people of Romanian descent
Year of birth missing (living people)
British women dramatists and playwrights
21st-century British dramatists and playwrights
21st-century British women writers
20th-century British dramatists and playwrights
20th-century British women writers
21st-century British Jews
20th-century British Jews
British republicans